Benjamin Walsh may refer to:
 Benjamin Dann Walsh (1808–1869), American entomologist
 Benjamin Walsh (politician) (c.1775–c.1818) British Member of Parliament for Wootton Bassett from 1808 until expelled in 1812